Expats is an upcoming American drama streaming television series based on the 2016 novel The Expatriates by Janice Y. K. Lee that is set to premiere on Amazon Prime Video.

Premise
Expats follows "the vibrant lives of a close-knit expatriate community: where affluence is celebrated, friendships are intense but knowingly temporary, and personal lives, deaths and marriages are played out publicly—then retold with glee."

Cast
Nicole Kidman as Margaret
Ji-young Yoo as Mercy
Jack Huston as David Starr
Sarayu Blue as Hilary Starr
Brian Tee as Clarke
Flora Chan as Olive

Production

Development
On February 7, 2017, it was reported that Blossom Films had optioned the screen rights to Janice Y.K. Lee's novel The Expatriates with the intention of developing it into a television series. Alice Bell was attached to write the adaptation. Executive producers were expected to consist of Nicole Kidman, Per Saari, and Theresa Park with Lee set to serve as a consulting producer. Alongside Blossom Films, production companies involved with the production were slated to include POW! Productions. On July 28, 2018, it was announced that Amazon had given the production a series order. On January 11, 2019, it was announced that Melanie Marnich had joined Bell as co-showrunner and executive producer for the series. In December 2019, it was announced Lulu Wang would serve as an executive producer on the series, while also writing and directing multiple episodes.

Casting 
Alongside the initial development announcement, it was reported that Nicole Kidman would star in the series. In May 2021, Ji-young Yoo was cast in the series. In June 2021, Jack Huston and Sarayu Blue joined the cast. In September 2021, Brian Tee joined the cast.

Controversies 
Amazon Prime's decision to produce two series in Hong Kong about expatriates – the other one being Exciting Times – was criticised as being insensitive towards the city which was suffering from a rapidly deteriorating political situation under the Hong Kong national security law imposed by the government of the People's Republic of China. Hong Kong’s newspaper of record, the South China Morning Post, referred to the series as “tone deaf” and out of touch, because author Janice Y. K. Lee is the daughter of Korean immigrants who left Hong Kong for the US with her family when she was 15.

Leading actor Nicole Kidman's exemption from the city's mandatory 21-day in-hotel quarantine regime was also criticised as she arrived by private jet with bodyguards on August 12, 2021, while the Hong Kong authorities responded that the quarantine exemption was granted "for the purpose of performing designated professional work, taking into account that it is conducive to maintaining the necessary operation and development of Hong Kong’s economy". Residents objected to what they considered grossly unfair treatment, and internet users also reacted negatively. Prominent activist David Webb reacted with an ironic tweet; several lawmakers expressed concern over the exemption inside the legislature. Responding to the controversy, Secretary for Commerce and Economic Development Edward Yau denied that the exemption violated existing policies, and said that the crew would have to be fully vaccinated and comply with quarantine exemption requirements identical to those made available to bankers. While one person said that the series would bring good publicity and jobs to Hong Kong, dissident artist Badiucao said that the communist-backed regime would use it "as a soft propaganda program that will sugarcoat the lies in Hong Kong".

References

English-language television shows
Upcoming drama television series
2020s American drama television series
Amazon Prime Video original programming
Television shows based on American novels
Television series by Amazon Studios